Mainline E.P. is an EP by Hate Dept., released on October 3, 1995 by Neurotic Records.

Reception
Sonic Boom noted the more languid tone of Mainline E.P. and said "the lyrics are still bitter throughout most of the tracks, but the music showcases a nice contrast between mellow, emotionally filled tracks and hard-edged aggressive tracks." Aiding & Abetting praised the distinct feel of each track and said "the four songs here keep up the techno-industrial vision promulgated before."

Track listing

Personnel
Adapted from the Mainline E.P. liner notes.

Hate Dept.
 Coby Bassett – guitar
 Ryan Daily – drums
 Charles Hunt – drums
 Rob Robinson – keyboards, guitar
 Steven Seibold – lead vocals, programming, production

Additional performers
 Dianna O'Donahue – vocals and arrangements (1)

Production and design
 David Braucher – art direction
 Alberto Lopez – executive-producer
 Bill Walker – executive-producer

Release history

References

External links 
 
 Mainline E.P. at Discogs (list of releases)

1995 EPs
Hate Dept. albums